Saint Ferréol may refer to:

People
Ferréol and Ferjeux (Ferreolus and Ferrutio), priest and deacon, martyrs and patrons of Besançon
 Saint Ferréol of Uzès (died 581), bishop of Uzès

Places

Canada

 Saint-Ferréol, Quebec

France

Saint-Ferréol is the name or part of the name of several communes in France:
 Saint-Ferréol-de-Comminges, in the Haute-Garonne département 
 Saint-Ferréol, Haute-Savoie, in the Haute-Savoie département
 Saint-Ferréol-d'Auroure, in the Haute-Loire département
 Saint-Ferréol-des-Côtes, in the Puy-de-Dôme département 
 Saint-Ferréol-Trente-Pas, in the Drôme département
 Bassin de Saint-Ferréol, an artificial lake supplying water to the Canal du Midi